Beta-ureidopropionase is an enzyme that in humans is encoded by the UPB1 gene.

This gene encodes a protein that belongs to the CN hydrolase family. Beta-ureidopropionase catalyzes the last step in the pyrimidine degradation pathway. The pyrimidine bases uracil and thymine are degraded via the consecutive action of dihydropyrimidine dehydrogenase (DHPDH), dihydropyrimidinase (DHP) and beta-ureidopropionase (UP) to beta-alanine and beta-aminoisobutyric acid, respectively. UP deficiencies are associated with N-carbamyl-beta-amino aciduria and may lead to abnormalities in neurological activity.

Interactive pathway map

References

Further reading